Dabiživ Čihorić (1334 – died January 1362) was a Serbian nobleman who served king and emperor Stefan Dušan (r. 1331–55) and emperor Uroš V (r. 1355–71), with the title of sluga. He was not a usual sluga (a cup-bearer), but had the same responsibilities as those of the kaznac and tepčija. A member of the Čihorić family (also called Drugović), a powerful family in the Trebinje region, his brothers Vratko and Nenac held the title of župan (count), while Stepko held the title of tepčija. Dabiživ was present in the hinterland of Dubrovnik between 1334 and 1349, but was first mentioned with the title of sluga in 1343 (Dabiseo sluga). That mention is of him together with the Ragusan rector Marco Mauroceno and "elders" (starce) established boundaries between territories of the Republic of Ragusa and Trebinje, that is, the Kingdom of Serbia. In 1345 the Ragusan ministers complained to Stefan Dušan that Dabiživ had imposed a customs tax at Trebinje, one dinar per each goods load that passed by. Stefan Dušan abolished this tax, as known from a letter dated 26 October 1346 sent from Serres. Dabiživ's competences is explained as that he acted as the royal deputy in Trebinje and Konavle. Earlier, in 1330, the governor of Konavle and the wider area of Trebinje was župan Hlapen. It is assumed that Dabiživ was part of the preparations of organizing a special court of "young king" Uroš V, that while he governed Trebinje he was decided to be the sluga of Uroš V. In 1346, Uglješa Mrnjavčević became the deputy in Trebinje and Konavle. After the coronation of Stefan Dušan as emperor (1346), when Uroš V became king and co-ruler, Dabiživ left Trebinje to be in the nearest circle of Uroš V, whom he served faithfully until his death in January 1362. Dabiživ was buried at the Treskavac monastery near Prilep, his grave inscription mentioning him as the enohijar (which according to S. Novaković was the brewer or cellarer, that is, a cup-bearer) of emperor Uroš V.

Dabiživ Čihorić "the younger" (fl. 1383–1402), a nobleman in Popovo, was Dabiživ's relative, likely nephew (as the son of Nenac).

References

Sources

 
 
 
 
 
 

14th-century Serbian nobility
Medieval Serbian magnates
People of the Serbian Empire
People of the Kingdom of Serbia (medieval)
Year of birth unknown
1362 deaths
Trebinje
Medieval Herzegovina
History of the Serbs of Bosnia and Herzegovina